Ascent Abort-2 (AA-2) was a test of the launch escape system (LAS) of NASA's Orion spacecraft.

The test followed Orion's Pad Abort-1 test in 2010, and Exploration Flight Test-1 in 2014 in which the capsule first flew in space. It precedes an uncrewed flight of Orion around the Moon as the Artemis 1 mission, and paves the way for human use of Orion in subsequent missions of the Artemis program. 

The test flight took place on July 2, 2019 at 07:00 ET (11:00 UTC). The flight was successful, and the launch abort system performed as designed.

Mission highlights 
An Orion test article, aerodynamically similar to but lacking the full features of the space-tested capsule, was launched from Cape Canaveral SLC-46 by the purpose-built Orion Abort Test Booster (ATB). The booster was a repurposed Peacekeeper missile first stage (SR118) procured from the United States Air Force and modified for the mission by Orbital ATK/Northrop Grumman, similar to the first stage of the Peacekeeper-derived Minotaur IV. The mission's goal was to demonstrate and qualify the Orion Launch Abort System (LAS) that will allow the astronaut crew to safely escape in the event of an emergency during launch pad operations, through the ascent phase of the Orion vehicle.

No parachute system was installed on the Crew Module because they are very expensive and have already been tested multiple times. The test article transmitted telemetry data during its flight, and as a backup 12 data recorders were ejected in pairs during its descent, starting about 20 seconds after separation of the capsule from the abort motor. They were recovered from the Atlantic Ocean.

References

External links
NASA video of the test (2:05)
NASA video explaining the test prior to launch (1:38)
NASA blog providing updates on the test

Orion (spacecraft)
2019 in spaceflight
2019 in Florida
July 2019 events in the United States
Test spaceflights